A list of Portuguese films that were first released in 2011. 30 Portuguese films were released, including 23 feature films, earning €415,953.44 at the Portuguese box office and accounting for 0.5% of the total box office gross, 0.7% of the total number of admissions and 8.1% of the total number of films in Portugal.

See also
2011 in Portugal

References

2011
Lists of 2011 films by country or language
2011 in Portugal